The Cabinda snake-eyed skink or Cabinda lidless skink (Panaspis cabindae) is a species of lidless skinks in the family Scincidae. The species is found in the Democratic Republic of the Congo and Angola.

References

Panaspis
Reptiles described in 1866
Taxa named by José Vicente Barbosa du Bocage